Bull Island is an island located in Dublin Bay in Ireland.

Bull Island or Bulls Island or Bull's Island may also refer to the following:

Places
Bull Island (Antarctica), see Kemp Rock

United States
Bull Island (California)
Bull Island, Illinois, location of the 1972 Erie Canal Soda Pop Festival
Bull Island (Dukes County, Massachusetts)
Bull Island (Essex County, Massachusetts), an island of Massachusetts
Bull Island (Montana), an island in Flathead Lake
Bull's Island Recreation Area, New Jersey
Bull's Island, location of Bull's Island Recreation Area
Bull Island (South Carolina), formerly called Bulls Island, part of Cape Romain National Wildlife Refuge

Other
Bull Island (TV series), a satirical RTÉ television and radio series

See also
 Bell Island (disambiguation)
 Buol Island, Indonesia
 Bulla Island, in the Caspian Sea